Euchrysops malathana, the common smoky blue or smoky bean Cupid, is a butterfly of the family Lycaenidae. It is found in south-western Arabia and Africa, south of the Sahara including Madagascar.

The wingspan is 22–30 mm for males and 23–31 mm for females. Adults are on wing year-round, with a peak from December to May in South Africa.

The larvae feed on Sphenostylis angustifolius, Medicago, Psidium, Canavalia and Vigna species (including V. triloba and V. unguiculata).

References

Butterflies described in 1833
Euchrysops